Lucas Silva Borges  (born 16 February 1993), known as Lucas Silva, is a Brazilian professional footballer who plays as a central midfielder for Grêmio.

Club career

Cruzeiro
Born in Bom Jesus de Goiás, Goiás, Silva joined Cruzeiro's youth setup in 2007, aged 14, after starting out at lowly locals AE Ovel. He was nearly released by the club in his first year as a youth, but later stood out and progressed through the youth levels.

In 2012 Silva was loaned to Nacional de Nova Serrana until the end of the year's Campeonato Mineiro. He made his senior debut on 10 March, starting in a 2–4 away loss against Atlético Mineiro. It was the only appearance Silva made for the club before returning to Cruzeiro.

On 26 April 2012, after returning from loan, Silva was promoted to the main squad by manager Vágner Mancini. He made his first team – and Série A – debut on 18 July, coming on as a second half substitute for Tinga in a 2–0 away win against Portuguesa. He was predominantly used as backup throughout the season and appeared in only eight matches during what was his first professional year at Raposa.

The arrival of new manager Marcelo Oliveira in 2013 saw an increase in game time at Cruzeiro for Silva. He scored his first professional goals on 1 September, netting a brace in a 5–3 home win against Vasco da Gama, and appeared in 23 matches during the campaign as his side were crowned champions. The following season Silva was an ever-present figure in Cruzeiro's midfield as the club were again crowned Série A champions. At the conclusion of the season, Silva was elected the tournament's best defensive midfielder.

Real Madrid
On 22 January 2015, Spanish La Liga side Real Madrid agreed an undisclosed fee for Silva, rumoured to be €14 million (£9.7 million). He was officially announced by the club in the following day, and signed a -year contract. Silva made his debut for the Merengues on 14 February 2015, coming on as a second-half substitute for Asier Illarramendi in a 2–0 home win against Deportivo de La Coruña.

On 3 September 2019, Real Madrid and Silva terminated the contract by mutual consent.

Loan to Marseille
On 26 August 2015, it was announced that Marseille had signed Silva on loan for the 2015–16 season. He made his debut on 13 September, playing the full 90 minutes as Marseille beat Bastia 4–1 in Ligue 1. During the January transfer market, Silva was asked by chairman Vincent Labrune to terminate his loan at Marseille and join Anderlecht instead. He refused the request and was subsequently dropped and excluded from the UEFA Europa League squad for the remainder of the season.

Return to Cruzeiro (loan)
Lucas Silva returned to Cruzeiro on 31 January 2017, signing a loan deal until 30 June 2018. On 3 July 2018, it was announced that he would return on loan for one more season.

International career
On 30 October 2012, Silva was called up to Brazil under-20s, for friendlies against Paraguay. He was also called up to the under-21s for 2014 Toulon Tournament, appearing in four matches and scoring once during the competition.

Career statistics
.''

Honours

Club
Cruzeiro
Campeonato Brasileiro Série A: 2013, 2014
Copa do Brasil: 2017, 2018
Campeonato Mineiro: 2014, 2018, 2019

Grêmio
Campeonato Gaúcho: 2020, 2021, 2022
Recopa Gaúcha: 2021, 2022

International
Brazil U21
Toulon Tournament: 2014

Individual
Campeonato Brasileiro Série A Team of the Year: 2014

References

External links

1993 births
Sportspeople from Goiás
Living people
Brazilian footballers
Association football midfielders
Campeonato Brasileiro Série A players
Campeonato Brasileiro Série B players
La Liga players
Cruzeiro Esporte Clube players
Nacional Esporte Clube (MG) players
Real Madrid CF players
Olympique de Marseille players
Ligue 1 players
Brazil under-20 international footballers
Brazil youth international footballers
Brazilian expatriate footballers
Brazilian expatriate sportspeople in France
Brazilian expatriate sportspeople in Spain
Expatriate footballers in Spain
Expatriate footballers in France